"(Till) I Kissed You" is a song written by Don Everly of The Everly Brothers. It was released as a single in 1959 and peaked at No. 4 on the Billboard Hot 100.  Chet Atkins played guitar on this record and Jerry Allison played drums. Recorded 7 July 1959 at RCA Victor Studio, Nashville, Tennessee, and issued as a single (Cadence 1369) July/August 1959 coupled with ‘Oh, What A Feeling’. Don Everly (guitar); Phil Everly (guitar); Chester B. “Chet” Atkins (electric guitar); Sonny Curtis (guitar); Floyd T. “Lightnin’” Chance (bass); Jerry “J.I.” Allison (drums); Floyd Cramer (piano). Producer: Archie Bleyer.

Connie Smith version
"(Till) I Kissed You" was covered by American country music artist Connie Smith on her 1976 album The Song We Fell in Love To. Released in January 1976, it was the album's second single. Smith's version peaked at No. 10 on the Billboard Hot Country Singles chart. It also reached No. 1 on the RPM Country Tracks chart in Canada.

Reggae versions

The song has been a popular choice for reggae artists and several covers have been recorded including those by: Nan McClean, Delroy Jones, Dobbie Dobson and Al Campbell. In 1975 Jimmy London topped the charts in Jamaica with his version of the song and subsequently scored highly on reggae charts abroad. In the early 90s, the Bronx-raised Shinehead did a version.

Chart performance

The Everly Brothers

Connie Smith

References

1959 singles
1976 singles
The Everly Brothers songs
Connie Smith songs
Songs written by Don Everly
Cadence Records singles
Columbia Records singles
1959 songs